Blaze Away may refer to

Blaze Away (album) by British band Morcheeba
Blaze Away!, popular marching tune by Abe Holzmann
Blaze Away (1922 film) directed by William Hughes Curran and starring Guinn "Big Boy" Williams
"Blaze Away" (song), lyrics added to Holzman's march by Jimmy Kennedy 

“Blaze Away” (brand), Brand of professional strength XLC mal-odor counteractant odor elimination products.